YuppTV is an over-the-top (OTT) content provider for South Asian content including live television and films with recording and storage features. YuppTV allows broadcasters and content providers to reach an audience, and allows consumers to view content on up to six screens of connected TVs, STBs, PC, smartphones, tablets and game consoles.

Cricket 

YuppTV has acquired the digital media rights for the 2021 Indian Premier League in Australia, Sri Lanka, Nepal, Japan, Bhutan, Maldives, Central Asia, Continental Europe, Central & South America, and Southeast Asia (except Malaysia, Singapore).

It also purchased the media rights for broadcasting 2022 ICC World Cup in Bhutan and Nepal.

Services 

Headquartered in Atlanta and Hyderabad, YuppTV offers 300+ TV channels in 15 languages: Tamil, Telugu, Hindi, Malayalam, Kannada, Marathi, Bengali, Punjabi, Oriya, Gujarati, Sinhalese, Bangla, Nepali, Urdu and English.

YuppTV allows access through 25 devices on up to six screens including gaming consoles, smart phones, and other connected devices.

Partnerships 

In July 2016, YuppTV joined hands with Mumbai-based content platform Arre to distribute content on its YuppTV Bazaar platform. About the partnership, Arre co-founder and managing director, B. Saikumar, said, "Arre is excited to reach out to an Indian and worldwide audience through YuppTV Bazaar's OTT platform. We look forward to a long-term association with YuppTV and hope to partner on many more content offerings on YuppTV Bazaar." In March 2022, YuppTV entered into a partnership with Prasar Bharati to help the latter widen its reach.

References 

Indian entertainment websites
Video on demand services